Baptist Proby  (bapt. 14 June 1726 – 18 January 1807) was Dean of Lichfield from 1776 until 1807.

Life
Proby was the fifth son of John Proby of Elton Hall in Elton, Huntingdonshire,  MP for Huntingdonshire (1722–27) and Stamford (1743–47), and his wife Hon. Jane Leveson-Gower, eldest daughter of John Leveson-Gower, 1st Baron Gower. His elder brother was John Proby, 1st Baron Carysfort. He was educated at Jesus College, Cambridge; and ordained in 1750. He held incumbencies at Exton, Doddington, Thornhaugh and Wansford before his time as Dean.

He died on 18 January 1807.

Family
Proby married Mary Russell, daughter of John Russell, rector of Fiskerton. They had 14 children, of whom eight survived to adulthood: 

 John Proby (bapt. 5 March 1753 – ), died in infancy
 Mary Proby (bapt. 10 September 1754 – 27 February 1829), married in 1782 Francis Mackenzie, 1st Baron Seaforth
Jane Proby (bapt. 11 December 1755 – ), died in infancy
Baptist Beresford Proby (bapt. 15 April 1757 – 1758), died in infancy
 Granville Proby (bapt. 18 February 1759 – buried 23 February 1759), died in infancy
 Granville Proby (bapt. 21 August 1760 – ), died in infancy
 Baptist John Proby (1761–1829), became vicar of Brewood, married Mary Susannah, youngest daughter of Sir Nigel Bowyer Gresley, 7th Baronet
 Catherine Proby (bapt. 15 July 1762 – ), married her cousin, Rev. Charles Proby, son of Capt. Charles Proby, R.N.
 John Proby (bapt. 11 April 1764 – ), died in infancy
 Caroline Proby (bapt. 16 October 1766 – 2 February 1800), married in 1792, Edward Grove
 Anne Proby (bapt. 25 October 1768 – 19 November 1847), died unmarried in Clifton, Bristol
 Charles Proby (1771–1859), Canon of Windsor, married 1814, Frances, daughter of the Rev. John Sharrar
Joshua John Brownlow Proby (bapt. 28 October 1773 – 4 March 1810), died in Bengal
 Susan Proby (died 11 August 1804), youngest daughter, died unmarried in Clifton

References

Alumni of Jesus College, Cambridge
Deans of Lichfield
1726 births
1807 deaths